In Greek mythology, Polites, the friend of Odysseus, was a minor character in the epics by Homer.

Mythology 
Polites was a member of Odysseus's crew. Odysseus refers to him as his dearest friend, though he is only mentioned twice, once as part of Eurylochus's scouting group on Circe's island (he is one of the first to enter Circe's palace) and then when, after a year, he convinces Odysseus to leave Circe. He is killed either by Scylla or the lightning bolt that Zeus throws at Odysseus' ship for his crew eating the cattle of Helios.

Note

Reference 

 Homer, The Odyssey with an English Translation by A.T. Murray, PH.D. in two volumes. Cambridge, MA., Harvard University Press; London, William Heinemann, Ltd. 1919. . Online version at the Perseus Digital Library. Greek text available from the same website.

Characters in the Odyssey